This is a list of the best-selling singles in 2016 in Japan, physical sales are taken from Oricon. Digital sales are taken from the certifications of RIAJ in 2016.

See also
List of Oricon number-one singles of 2016

Notes
Umi no Koe was released on December 2, 2015, certified as Million in April 2016 by RIAJ.
Kuchibiru ni Be My Baby was released on December 9, 2015. Its B-side song, 365 Nichi no Kamihikouki, was certified as Double Platinum in July 2016 by RIAJ.

References

2016 in Japanese music
2016
Oricon
Japanese music-related lists